Taxation in Sweden on salaries for an employee involves contributing to three different levels of government: the municipality, the county council, and the central government. Social security contributions are paid to finance the social security system.

Income tax on salaries is deducted by the employer (a PAYE system) and paid directly by the employer to the Swedish Tax Agency (Skatteverket).

The effective taxation rate in Sweden is commonly cited as among the highest in the world; see list of countries by tax rates.

Sweden has a taxation system for income from work that combines an income tax (paid by the employee) with social security contributions (employers contributions) that are paid by the employer. The total salary cost for the employer is thereby the gross salary plus the payroll tax. The employer makes monthly preliminary deductions (PAYE) for income tax and also pays the payroll tax to the Swedish Tax Agency.

The income tax is contingent on the person being taxable in Sweden, and the social security contributions are contingent on the person being part of the Swedish social insurance plan. The income tax is finalised through a yearly tax assessment the year following the income year.

27% of taxpayer money in Sweden goes towards education and healthcare, whereas 5% goes to the police and military, and 42% to social security.

Value added tax
The value added tax (mervärdesskatt or moms) rate in Sweden is 25%, with exceptions for food and services like hotel room rental fees (12%), and for sales of publications, admission tickets to cultural events and travel within Sweden (6%).

Income tax
Sweden has a progressive income tax, the rates for 2021 are as follows (based on yearly incomes):

Taxable income is reduced by general deductions which means that the marginal tax in practice varies between 7% on incomes just above 20,008 kronor to 60.1% on incomes above 675,700 kronor. For an average salary, on an additional pay of 100 kronor, the employee first pays 32 kronor in income tax (direct, 32%).

Payroll tax 
In 2018, the Swedish social security contribution paid by the employer is 31.42%, calculated on top of the employee's salary before taxes. The percentage is lower for old employees. The specifics of the payroll tax (National Insurance in UK English) may be found at the Swedish Tax Agency's Website. In addition, the employee pays 7% in pension contributions to the public system, with a cap at an annual income of 420,447 kr. Thus, the maximum employee contribution is 29,400 kr. However, this contribution is neutralized by a corresponding income tax reduction (tax credit) for the employee.

Corporate & capital gains tax
Sweden has a flat tax rate of 30% for capital gains. The Swedish tax authorities defines capital gains as incomes that can not be attributed to business operations or service. For example; rental of private assets, dividends, profit from the sale of assets and interest payments. Corporate net income is taxed at a flat rate of 22%.

Registering a non-Swedish company or sole trader in Sweden 
A foreign company conducting business in Sweden, whether a natural or a legal person, may become taxable for VAT, employer's contributions and/or income tax. The company should then apply for registration at the Swedish Tax Agency, and may apply for a Swedish F-tax certificate.

In the ‘Tax application for foreign entrepreneurs´ brochure and form, SKV 419 and SKV 4632 respectively, there is information on how to submit the application.

Sole traders who have a Swedish personal number, and corporations that have a representative who has a Swedish personal number and who is also authorised to sign (authorised to sign by himself) on behalf of the company, may submit the application electronically through the verksamt.se website. Verksamt.se is jointly managed by the Swedish Tax Agency, the Swedish Companies Registration Office and the Swedish Agency for Economic and Regional Growth. Other foreign companies may submit their application directly to the International Tax Offices at the Swedish Tax Agency by post. When registered with the Swedish Tax Agency, the foreign company receives a unique Swedish identity number. For natural persons to receive such a number they must verify their identity with a passport or another such identity card or documentation. For a legal person it is required that the identity is verified with some form of attested certificate of registration/incorporation and that the representative demonstrates his/her authority to represent (sign) on behalf of the legal person when it requests registration for taxation. Foreign legal persons active in Sweden should first contact the Swedish Companies Registration Office to ask if they are required to register a branch office. If such a registration is made with the Swedish Companies Registration Office, they will supplied with a Swedish registration number by the Swedish Tax Agency. For contact information, see the Swedish Companies Registrations Office website.

Further information in English can be found on the Swedish Tax Agency's website.

Buying a Swedish company or Swedish real-estate does not necessarily give right of residence in Sweden. Fraudsters have sold such assets claiming they would give right of residence.

See also
Swedish Taxpayers' Association
Swedish Tax Agency
Swedish F-tax certificate

References

Further reading

Swedish Tax Agency 2011. Tax registration of foreign companies in Sweden, Swedish Tax Agency's website